Nieborzyn may refer to the following places:
Nieborzyn, Greater Poland Voivodeship (west-central Poland)
Nieborzyn, Ciechanów County in Masovian Voivodeship (east-central Poland)
Nieborzyn, Płońsk County in Masovian Voivodeship (east-central Poland)